Standard Liège won their tenth ever league title thanks to a playoff victory against Anderlecht. They finished on the same point as them with the same number of games won. Following 1-1 away from home in Brussels, Standard won 1-0 at home thanks to a penalty scored by Axel Witsel.

The season also saw the club nearly qualifying for the Champions League, following two 0-0 draws against Liverpool. In the extra time, however, Dirk Kuyt scored a decisive late goal. In the UEFA Cup, where Standard dropped down to, they beat Everton in the qualifying phase, which caused Everton to pay £15 million for playmaker Marouane Fellaini, the highest ever fee paid for a Belgian player. In the UEFA Cup proper, Standard reached the Round of 32, where they were knocked out of the competition by Braga of Portugal.

Squad

Goalkeepers
  Anthony Moris
  Sinan Bolat
  Rorys Aragón

Defenders
  Dante
  Thomas Phibel
  Alexandre Jansen Da Silva
  Mohamed Sarr
  Digão
  Oguchi Onyewu
  Tomislav Mikulić
  Marcos Camozzato
  Landry Mulemo
  Marco Ingrao
  Eliaquim Mangala

Midfielders
  Réginal Goreux
  Wilfried Dalmat
  Jonathan Walasiak
  Axel Witsel
  Steven Defour (C)
  Salim Tuama
  Benjamin Nicaise
  Marouane Fellaini
  Mehdi Carcela

Attackers
  Milan Jovanović
  Cyriac
  Dieumerci Mbokani
  Igor de Camargo
  Leon Benko
  Christian Benteke

Sources
   Soccerway - Belgium - Standard de Liège (for results)

Standard Liège seasons
Standard Liege
Belgian football championship-winning seasons